Armchair warrior is a pejorative term that alludes to verbally fighting from the comfort of one's living room. It describes activities such as speaking out in support of a war, battle, or fight by someone with little or no military experience.

Typical "armchair warrior" activities include advocating sending troops to settle a conflict, lobbying to keep defense jobs to make outdated military equipment as part of the military-industrial complex, or to make political messages on radio or television talk shows in favor, or using armed forces in a conflict over trying diplomatic channels.

An early example of the term "armchair warrior" appeared in the 1963 Twilight Zone episode No Time Like the Past, in which a time traveler to the late 1800s uses the term in a speech directed towards a banker who is calling for sending young soldiers to fight a war against American Indians. The show's director, Rod Serling, had received a Purple Heart for injuries incurred while serving as a paratrooper in World War II.

This differs from "slacktivism" in that no action needs to be done by an "armchair warrior" beyond stating a point of view versus an act to give the appearance of making a difference from a "slacktivist". It is more of a variation of "chickenhawk", which was originally a slang term used during the Vietnam War to describe a superior officer that was not on the frontlines.

Don Henley refers to "armchair warriors" in his song "The End of the Innocence".

See also
Anonymous (group)
Armchair general
Armchair revolutionary
Armchair theorizing
Back-seat driver
Champagne socialist
Chickenhawk
Gauche caviar
Internet petition
Limousine liberal
Narcotizing dysfunction
Slacktivism

References

External links
 

Activism by type
Pejorative terms for people